Zamozhne — a village in Ukraine, in Zhmerynka Raion of Vinnytsia Oblast. It has a population of 678, and the local government is the Voynashivska village council.

External links
 Weather in Zamozhne (gismeteo)
 Weather in Zamozhne (meteoprog)
 Every family has a business
 Renaming as part of the ideological policy in the past and now
 History of towns and villages of the Ukrainian SSR
 Topographic map of the village Zamozhne
 Satellite map of the village
 Voynashivska community 
 The list of entities Vinnytsia region in 2015
 For information about municipalities
Villages in Zhmerynka Raion